Melanasomyia is a genus of parasitic flies in the family Tachinidae.

Species
Melanasomyia aberrans (Mesnil, 1957)
Melanasomyia flavipalpis Malloch, 1935

References

Tachinidae
Taxa named by John Russell Malloch
Diptera of Asia